Csengersima is a village in Szabolcs-Szatmár-Bereg county, in the Northern Great Plain region of eastern Hungary.

Geography

Sightseengs

The old romanesquechurch from the 13th century is famous, mainly because of its coffered ceiling. There are frescoes of the celestial bodies, flowers, old Biblical scenes in a beautiful drawing and coloring manner.

References
Balogh J. (1939): A késő-gótikus és a renaissance-kor művészete. (The late-gothic and renaissance age art.) Magyar művelődéstörténet. 2. (Szerk. Domanovszky S.), Budapest
Bérczi Sz, Bérczi Zs., Bérczi K. (2002): Kazettás mennyezetek. (Coffered ceilings.) Licium-Art, Debrecen
Kelemen L. (1977): Művészettörténeti tanulmányok. (Studies in Art History.) Bukarest
Tombor I. (1968): Magyarországi festett famennyezetek és rokonemlékek a XV-XIX. századból. (Painted Coffered Ceilings from Hungary from the 15-16th Century.) Akadémiai K. Budapest

External links
Short description about the church of Csengersima.
Image from inside the church.
Photographs of the beautiful church, outside and inside.

Populated places in Szabolcs-Szatmár-Bereg County
Romanesque architecture in Hungary